Yat Madit is a Ugandan drama  television series that premiered on NTV Uganda on December 8, 2016 and stars award-winners from Uganda Film Festival, including Michael Wawuyo (Senior), Michael Wawuyo Jr., Nisha Kalema, the muti-talented Rehema Nanfuka, Oyenbot and Patriq Nkakalukanyi. . Its onset director was Irene Kulabako and produced by Media Focus on Africa (MFA).

Plot
Yat Madit is a story of a community that has gone through turbulent times and is forging a life again. It’s a true story about post-war Northern Uganda and how communities there are trying to live their lives again after Joseph Kony’s LRA war through resettlement of war returnees, ex-soldiers and civilians.

It aims to promote intercultural dialogue and demonstrate alternative ways of dealing with conflicts, leading to more social cohesion and sustainable peace among Ugandans especially those in post-conflict situations.

The title Yat Madit means ‘a big tree’; it is under this tree that the community meets to discuss and solve problems.

Production
The series was set in a remote village in Kiboga, where the film crew settled for up to three months, delving into the life of what the people of northern Uganda have endured after 20 years of Joseph Kony’s Lord’s Resistance Army war.
The series was produced by Media Focus on Africa’s (MFA) and European Union, directed by Irene Kulabako.

Awards and nominations

See also
Beneath The Lies
Coffee Shop (TV Series)
Deception NTV
The Campus (TV Series)
Balikoowa in the City
The Hostel (TV Series)

References

Ugandan drama television series
2010s Ugandan television series
2016 Ugandan television series debuts
2017 Ugandan television series endings
NTV Uganda original programming